Vernon Sasso (born 10 February 1897, date of death unknown) was a Jamaican cricketer. He played in one first-class match for the Jamaican cricket team in 1929/30.

See also
 List of Jamaican representative cricketers

References

External links
 

1897 births
Year of death missing
Jamaican cricketers
Jamaica cricketers
Sportspeople from Kingston, Jamaica